B is a programming language developed at Bell Labs circa 1969 by Ken Thompson and Dennis Ritchie.

B was derived from BCPL, and its name may possibly be a contraction of BCPL.  Thompson's coworker Dennis Ritchie speculated that the name might be based on Bon, an earlier, but unrelated, programming language that Thompson designed for use on Multics.

B was designed for recursive, non-numeric, machine-independent applications, such as system and language software. It was a typeless language, with the only data type being the underlying machine's natural memory word format, whatever that might be. Depending on the context, the word was treated either as an integer or a memory address.

As machines with ASCII processing became common, notably the DEC PDP-11 that arrived at Bell, support for character data stuffed in memory words became important. The typeless nature of the language was seen as a disadvantage, which led Thompson and Ritchie to develop an expanded version of the language supporting new internal and user-defined types, which became the C programming language.

History 

Circa 1969, Ken Thompson and later Dennis Ritchie developed B basing it mainly on the BCPL language Thompson used in the Multics project. B was essentially the BCPL system stripped of any component Thompson felt he could do without in order to make it fit within the memory capacity of the minicomputers of the time. The BCPL to B transition also included changes made to suit Thompson's preferences (mostly along the lines of reducing the number of non-whitespace characters in a typical program). Much of the typical ALGOL-like syntax of BCPL was rather heavily changed in this process. The assignment operator := reverted to the = of Rutishauser's Superplan, and the equality operator = was replaced by ==.

Thompson added "two-address assignment operators" using x =+ y syntax to add y to x (in C the operator is written +=). This syntax came from Douglas McIlroy's implementation of TMG, in which B's compiler was first implemented (and it came to TMG from ALGOL 68's x +:= y syntax). Thompson went further by inventing the increment and decrement operators (++ and --). Their prefix or postfix position determines whether the value is taken before or after alteration of the operand. This innovation was not in the earliest versions of B. According to Dennis Ritchie, people often assumed that they were created for the auto-increment and auto-decrement address modes of the DEC PDP-11, but this is historically impossible as the machine didn't exist when B was first developed.

The semicolon version of the for loop was borrowed by Ken Thompson from the work of Stephen Johnson.

B is typeless, or more precisely has one data type: the computer word. Most operators (e.g. +, -, *, /) treated this as an integer, but others treated it as a memory address to be dereferenced. In many other ways it looked a lot like an early version of C. There are a few library functions, including some that vaguely resemble functions from the standard I/O library in C. 
In Thompson's words: "B and the old old C were very very similar languages except for all the types [in C]".

Early implementations were for the DEC PDP-7 and PDP-11 minicomputers using early Unix, and Honeywell  36-bit mainframes running the operating system GCOS. The earliest PDP-7 implementations compiled to threaded code, and Ritchie wrote a compiler using TMG which produced machine code. In 1970 a PDP-11 was acquired and threaded code was used for the port; an assembler, and the B language itself were written in B to bootstrap the computer. An early version of yacc was produced with this PDP-11 configuration. Ritchie took over maintenance during this period.

The typeless nature of B made sense on the Honeywell, PDP-7 and many older computers, but was a problem on the PDP-11 because it was difficult to elegantly access the character data type that the PDP-11 and most modern computers fully support. Starting in 1971 Ritchie made changes to the language while converting its compiler to produce machine code, most notably adding data typing for variables. During 1971 and 1972 B evolved into "New B" (NB) and then C.

B is almost extinct, having been superseded by the C language. However, it continues to see use on GCOS mainframes 
and on certain embedded systems for a variety of reasons: limited hardware in small systems, extensive libraries, tooling, licensing cost issues, and simply being good enough for the job. The highly influential AberMUD was originally written in B.

Examples 
The following examples are from the Users' Reference to B by Ken Thompson:

/* The following function will print a non-negative number, n, to
   the base b, where 2<=b<=10.  This routine uses the fact that
   in the ASCII character set, the digits 0 to 9 have sequential
   code values.  */

printn(n, b) {
        extrn putchar;
        auto a;
        /* Wikipedia note: the auto keyword declares a variable with
           automatic storage (lifetime is function scope), not
           "automatic typing" as in C++11. */

        if (a = n / b)        /* assignment, not test for equality */
                printn(a, b); /* recursive */
        putchar(n % b + '0');
}

/* The following program will calculate the constant e-2 to about
   4000 decimal digits, and print it 50 characters to the line in
   groups of 5 characters.  The method is simple output conversion
   of the expansion
     1/2! + 1/3! + ... = .111....
   where the bases of the digits are 2, 3, 4, . . . */

main() {
	extrn putchar, n, v;
	auto i, c, col, a;

	i = col = 0;
	while(i<n)
		v[i++] = 1;
	while(col<2*n) {
		a = n+1;
		c = i = 0;
		while (i<n) {
			c =+ v[i] *10;
			v[i++]  = c%a;
			c =/ a--;
		}

		putchar(c+'0');
		if(!(++col%5))
			putchar(col%50?' ': '*n');
	}
	putchar('*n*n');
}
v[2000];
n 2000;

See also

Notes

References

External links 
 Manual page for b(1) from Unix First Edition
 The Development of the C Language, Dennis M. Ritchie. Puts B in the context of BCPL and C.
 Users' Reference to B'', Ken Thompson. Describes the PDP-11 version.
 The Programming Language B, S. C. Johnson & B. W. Kernighan, Technical Report CS TR 8, Bell Labs (January 1973). The GCOS version on Honeywell equipment.
 B Language Reference Manual, Thinkage Ltd. The production version of the language as used on GCOS, including language and runtime library.

Procedural programming languages
Programming languages
Programming languages created in 1969